Shcherbinka is a railway station of Line D2 of the Moscow Central Diameters in Moscow. It was opened in 1895 and will be rebuilt soon.

Gallery

References

Railway stations in Moscow
Railway stations of Moscow Railway
Railway stations in the Russian Empire opened in 1895
Line D2 (Moscow Central Diameters)  stations